Joe "747" Adams (born April 5, 1958) is a former Canadian football quarterback who played three seasons in the Canadian Football League with the Saskatchewan Roughriders, Toronto Argonauts and Ottawa Rough Riders during 1982 to 1984. He was drafted by the San Francisco 49ers in the twelfth round of the 1981 NFL Draft, but remained a practice squad member during his one year with the team. He played college football at Tennessee State University. Adams garnered the nickname "747" in reference to the Boeing 747 aircraft.

References

External links
Just Sports Stats
Joe Adams trading card

Living people
1958 births
American football quarterbacks
Canadian football quarterbacks
Tennessee State Tigers football players
Place of birth missing (living people)
Saskatchewan Roughriders players
Toronto Argonauts players
Ottawa Rough Riders players